Manuel de Almeida (1580–1646) was Portuguese Jesuit priest and missionary.

Manuel de Almeida may also refer to:

 Manuel Antônio de Almeida (1831–1861), Brazilian journalist and writer
 Manuel Quintas de Almeida (1957–2006), lieutenant and presidential guard in São Tomé and Príncipe
 Manuel de Almeida (equestrian) (born 1993), Brazilian dressage rider
 Manuel de Almeida (singer), Portuguese singer, see The Rough Guide to the Music of Portugal

See also
 Almeida (disambiguation)